Taiping Municipal Council (abbreviated MPT) is the municipal council which administers Taiping in the state of Perak, Malaysia. This council was established after the township. Their jurisdiction covers an area of 186.46 square kilometres.

The council consists of the mayor plus twenty-three councillors appointed to serve a one-year term by the Perak State Government. MPT is responsible for public health and sanitation, waste removal and management, town planning, environmental protection and building control, social and economic development and general maintenance functions of urban infrastructure

History
MPT started as a Sanitary Board in 1874, formed by the British. From its gradual and sturdy development, it obtained Larut & Matang District Council (MDLM) its Municipal status on 1 September 1979.

In general, the council as the local authority, is a Corporate Body established under the Local Government Act 1976 (Act 171), being the body responsible for managing the Taiping area based on local interest, as well as a local planning authority under the Town and Country Planning Act 1976 (Act 172); MPT is directly tasked by Law to formulate and implement development planning policies based on centralised locality in accordance to the policies set by the Government.

Administrative area

Currently, the boundary of the Council covers an area of 186.46 square kilometres with a population of over 198,112 people. 

The following towns, suburbs, and neighbourhoods comprise the area formally (and collectively) under MPT:
 Kamunting
 Aulong
 Pokok Assam
 Air Kuning
 Changkat Jering
 Simpang
 Kampung Paya
 Kampung Jelutong
 Kampung Cheh
 Kampung Pauh
 Kampung Dew
 Changkat Ibol
 Bukit Gantang
 Rancangan Perkampungan tersusun Kpg Ulu Tupai
 Tupai Industrial Area
 Green House Area
 Assam Kumbang
 Bukit Jana
 Kampung Boyan
 Larut Tin
 Klian Pauh
 Taiping Heights
 Ayer Putih
 Kampung Pinang
 Matang
 Kuala Sepetang
 Kampung Senduk Tengah
 Kampung Batu Tegoh

Current appointed councillors

Here are the appointed councillors from  :-
 YBrs Tuan Khairul Amir bin Mohamad Zubir

References

External links

Taiping
City councils